Sovětice is a municipality and village in Hradec Králové District in the Hradec Králové Region of the Czech Republic. It has about 200 inhabitants.

Administrative parts
The village of Horní Černůtky is an administrative part of Sovětice.

References

Villages in Hradec Králové District